Oculicosa is a genus of spiders in the family Lycosidae. It was first described in 1993 by Zyuzin. , it contains only one species, Oculicosa supermirabilis, found in Central Asia (Kazakhstan, Uzbekistan, and Turkmenistan).

References

Lycosidae
Monotypic Araneomorphae genera
Spiders of Asia